Fathabad-e Now (also Romanized as Fatḩābād-e Now; also known as Fatḩābād) is a village in Bala Jowayin Rural District, in the Central District of Jowayin County, Razavi Khorasan Province, Iran. At the 2006 census, its population was 597, in 140 families.

References 

Populated places in Joveyn County